K. Sundaram is an Indian politician Former Minister and was a Member of the Legislative Assembly of Tamil Nadu. He was elected to the Tamil Nadu legislative assembly from Ponneri constituency as a Dravida Munnetra Kazhagam candidate in the 1989 and 1996 elections. The constituency was reserved for candidates from the Scheduled Castes.

Electoral performance

References 

Dravida Munnetra Kazhagam politicians
Living people
Tamil Nadu MLAs 1996–2001
Year of birth missing (living people)